Ells may refer to:

 Ell, a measure of length
 Ell (architecture)
 Ells (surname), a surname
 Ells Field, an airport in Mendocino County, California, United States
 Ells River, in Alberta, Canada
 Euroleague for Life Sciences

See also 
 Ell (disambiguation)